Dylan Mares (born February 11, 1992) is an American professional soccer player who plays as an attacking midfielder for Louisville City in the USL Championship.

Career

Early career

From Zionsville, Indiana, played youth soccer with the Indiana Fire Academy from 2008 to 2010. Mares and A. J. Corrado led Zionsville Community High School to a 2009 IHSAA state championship in soccer. He then started his collegiate career at the University of Louisville where he played college soccer for the Louisville Cardinals from 2010 to 2012. Despite missing the entire 2011 season due to a knee injury, Mares still managed to rank up 15 goals in his two seasons for the Cardinals. He then transferred to Indiana University to play for the Indiana Hoosiers. He played in 22 matches in his lone season for the Hoosiers, scoring three goals. After his first season Mares decided to join the selection pool for the 2014 MLS SuperDraft. However, Mares was not selected in any of the four rounds. Mares then joined the pre-season camp of MLS side Real Salt Lake but did not earn a contract with the side.

Indy Eleven
In March 2014 it was reported that Mares had started to trial with the Indy Eleven, a new expansion franchise in the North American Soccer League. Before the season began it was confirmed that Mares had signed for the Indy Eleven. He then made his professional debut during Indy Eleven's very first match in their history against the Carolina Railhawks on April 12, 2014 at the Michael Carroll Stadium. Mares came on as an 84th-minute substitute for Corby Moore as Indy Eleven drew the match 1–1.

The Miami FC
On January 16, 2017, Mares signed with NASL side Miami FC.

El Paso Locomotive
Mares signed with El Paso Locomotive FC on March 2, 2020. He played 77 games for the club, scoring 19 goals and assisting another 17, before departing the club following the 2022 season.

Louisville City
On December 27, 2022, it was announced that Mares would join Louisville City for their 2023 USL Championship season.

Career statistics

Club

References

External links
 SoccerStats profile
 Indy Eleven profile
 Indiana profile
 Louisville profile

1992 births
Living people
People from Zionsville, Indiana
American soccer players
Louisville Cardinals men's soccer players
Indiana Hoosiers men's soccer players
Indy Eleven players
Miami FC players
El Paso Locomotive FC players
Louisville City FC players
Association football midfielders
Soccer players from Indiana
North American Soccer League players
National Premier Soccer League players
National Independent Soccer Association players
USL Championship players